Andrew Donald Bell (born 6 May 1956) is an English former footballer who played as a striker.

Career
Born in Taunton, Somerset, Bell played for hometown club Taunton Town before signing for Exeter City in July 1979. He made three appearances in the Football League during the 1979–80 season before joining Yeovil Town. He made 122 appearances and scored 36 goals for Yeovil in the Alliance Premier League. He joined Weymouth in 1983, making eight appearances and scoring one goal in the 1983–84 season. He played for Paulton Rovers during the 1984–85 season.

References

1956 births
Living people
Sportspeople from Taunton
English footballers
Association football forwards
Taunton Town F.C. players
Exeter City F.C. players
Yeovil Town F.C. players
Weymouth F.C. players
English Football League players
National League (English football) players
Paulton Rovers F.C. players